Advanced Automatic Collision Notification (AACN) is the successor to Automatic Collision Notification (ACN). To develop procedures that will help emergency medical responders better and more quickly determine if a motorist needs care at a trauma center after a vehicle crash, Center for Disease Control and the CDC Foundation recently partnered with OnStar and the GM Foundation. Through this partnership, CDC conducted a vehicle telematics initiative to develop evidence-based protocols for the emergency medical community to effectively use automotive telemetry data.

By enabling responders to more quickly identify, diagnose, and treat injuries, these data will help to reduce death and injuries among vehicle crash victims. As part of this initiative, CDC convened a panel of emergency medical physicians, trauma surgeons, public safety, and vehicle safety experts. The panel considered how real-time crash data from the advanced automatic crash notification (AACN) vehicle telematics system and similar systems can be used to determine whether injured patients need care at a trauma center. By using a collection of sensors, vehicle telemetry systems like AACN send crash data to an advisor if a vehicle is involved in a moderate or severe front, rear, or side-impact crash.

Depending on the type of system, the data include information about crash severity, the direction of impact, air bag deployment, multiple impacts, and rollovers (if equipped with appropriate sensors). Advisors can relay this information to emergency dispatchers, helping them to quickly determine the appropriate combination of emergency personnel, equipment, and medical facilities.

Vehicular Emergency Data Set (VEDS)

The Vehicular Emergency Data Set  is an XML-based standard for reporting collision data elements and medical data elements related to a collision. The standard was developed by the ComCARE Alliance, and is aimed at relaying critical information to facilitate efficient emergency response. This data set can be transmitted automatically to a response center, which can then forward it to emergency services providers. In the U.S., the Next Generation 9-1-1 initiative will enable a Public Safety Answering Point to automatically receive and process this data, thereby allowing for a quicker and more efficient response to a vehicle emergency, even when all occupants of the reporting vehicle are incapacitated.

See also 
  eCall - a European Union project
 Intelligent car
 IEEE Intelligent Transportation Systems Society
 Onstar
 Ford Sync's 911 Assist
 Lexus Link
 Safety Connect (Toyota)
 BMW Assist
 GPS tracking
 AACN and U.S. NG 9-1-1
 Collision avoidance system

References

External links and sources
 U.S. OnStar Website
 Howstuffworks: "How OnStar Works"
 ATX Group Website
 My-911 Phone app website

Vehicle safety technologies